The Bangor Public Library is the public library of Bangor, Maine. It shares the URSUS online cataloging system with the University of Maine and other Maine libraries.

The library's roots date to 1830, when the Bangor Mechanic Association assembled a private collection of books. In 1873, it absorbed several other associations' libraries and became the Bangor Mechanic Association Public Library.

In 1883, former U.S. Congressman and lumber baron Samuel F. Hersey left the City of Bangor a $100,000 bequest, which the city used to form a municipally owned public library. The Mechanic Association's 20,000 books formed the core collection. In 1905, the small membership fee was abolished and the library became truly open to all.

By 1911, the library's collection had grown to 70,000 books. Then came the Great Fire of 1911, which destroyed the library along with most of the Bangor Business District. The library reopened that May with the 29 books pulled from the ashes and 1,300 others that had been on loan. (Today, the library is listed on the National Register of Historic Places as part of the Great Fire of 1911 Historic District.)

In 1913, the library's new building, designed by the Boston architectural firm Peabody and Stearns, opened its doors near the high school.

In 1997, the library was renovated and a new wing added (designed by Robert A. M. Stern Architects), thanks to a donation from Stephen and Tabitha King. King's story The Library Policeman was inspired by his 10-year-old son's expressed fear of returning overdue books to the Bangor Public Library because of "the library police".

In 2014, the library was renovated again; plans included a new glass atrium designed by Scott Simons Architects.

On an interesting note, the library contains the couch that former VP Hannibal Hamlin drew his last breath upon while playing cards too hard.

References

External links
Official Site
 City of Bangor

Library buildings completed in 1913
Libraries on the National Register of Historic Places in Maine
Public libraries in Maine
Peabody and Stearns buildings
Libraries in Penobscot County, Maine
Educational buildings in Bangor, Maine
Tourist attractions in Bangor, Maine
Historic district contributing properties in Maine
1830 establishments in Maine
National Register of Historic Places in Bangor, Maine